The 1945 Tasmanian Australian National Football League (TANFL) premiership season was an Australian Rules football competition staged in Hobart, Tasmania over fifteen (15) roster rounds and four (4) finals series matches between 5 May and 29 September 1945.

This was the first season of post-World War Two football and much work was undertaken by officials, members, supporters and players in re-establishing the competition after it was closed down at the end of the 1941 season due to the War.

This was also the first season of a new district-based competition, North Hobart and New Town would be joined by a new club from the Hobart district (Hobart Football Club) who replaced Cananore and the newly formed Sandy Bay Football Club who would represent the Sandy Bay district as a replacement for the Lefroy Football Club.

Participating clubs
Hobart Football Club
New Town District Football Club
North Hobart Football Club
Sandy Bay Football Club

1945 TANFL Club Coaches
Cecil Geappen (Hobart)
C W Pettiona (New Town)
Jack Metherall (North Hobart)
Jack Rogers (Sandy Bay)

TANFL Reserves Grand Final
 No Reserves competition.

TANFL Under-19's Grand Final
State Schools Old Boys Football Association (SSOBFA)
Macalburn 5.5 (35) v South East 2.9 (21) – New Town Oval
Note: Macalburn were affiliated to Hobart, South East were affiliated to Sandy Bay.

State Grand Final
(Saturday, 6 October 1945)
Nth Hobart: 2.0 (12) | 5.3 (33) | 6.6 (42) | 12.12 (84)
Launceston: 5.6 (36) | 7.7 (49) | 11.10 (76) | 11.11 (77)
Attendance: 5,000 at York Park

Intrastate Matches
Jubilee Shield (Saturday, 9 June 1945)
TANFL 17.14 (116) v NTFA 17.11 (113) – Att: 6,000 at North Hobart Oval

Jubilee Shield (Saturday, 14 July 1945)
 NTFA 19.16 (130) v TANFL 17.15 (117) – Att: 9,000 at York Park

Jubilee Shield (Saturday, 18 August 1945)
NWFU 24.19 (163) v TANFL 16.14 (110) – Att: 6,000 at West Park Oval

Leading Goalkickers: TANFL
E.Collis (North Hobart) – 54

Medal winners
Noel Reid (North Hobart) – William Leitch Medal
Max Walker (Macalburn) – V.A Geard Medal (Under-19's)

1945 TANFL Ladder

Round 1
(Saturday, 5 May 1945)
New Town 11.14 (80) v Hobart 7.10 (52) – Att: 1,000 at North Hobart Oval
Nth Hobart 15.5 (95) v Sandy Bay 11.14 (80) – Att: 1,500 at Queenborough Oval

Round 2
(Saturday, 12 May 1945)
Nth Hobart 26.18 (174) v Hobart 7.9 (51) – Att: 800 at North Hobart Oval
Sandy Bay 14.13 (97) v New Town 10.11 (71) – Att: 651 at New Town Oval

Round 3
(Saturday, 19 May 1945)
Nth Hobart 11.13 (79) v New Town 9.11 (65) – Att: 1,453 at North Hobart Oval
Sandy Bay 9.11 (65) v Hobart 9.7 (61) – Att: 600 at Queenborough Oval

Round 4
(Saturday, 26 May 1945)
Nth Hobart 12.18 (90) v Sandy Bay 7.13 (55)  – Att: 1,689 at North Hobart Oval
New Town 8.12 (60) v Hobart 5.15 (45)  – Att: 520 at New Town Oval

Round 5
(Saturday, 2 June 1945)
Nth Hobart 18.16 (124) v Hobart 8.3 (51) – Att: 900 at North Hobart Oval
Sandy Bay 10.8 (68) v New Town 10.8 (68) – Att: 1,400 at Queenborough Oval

Round 6
(Saturday, 16 June & Monday, 18 June 1945)
Nth Hobart 14.13 (97) v New Town 4.11 (35) – Att: 2,000 at North Hobart Oval
Sandy Bay 8.19 (67) v Hobart 7.11 (53) – Att: 1,990 at North Hobart Oval (Monday)

Round 7
(Saturday, 23 June 1945)
New Town 9.9 (63) v Hobart 4.17 (41) – Att: 1,285 at North Hobart Oval
Nth Hobart 14.17 (101) v Sandy Bay 11.13 (79) – Att: 1,492 at Queenborough Oval

Round 8
(Monday, 30 June 1945)
Nth Hobart 8.12 (60) v Hobart 8.8 (56) – Att: 1,000 at North Hobart Oval
Sandy Bay 13.8 (86) v New Town 9.24 (78) – Att: 1,500 at New Town Oval

Round 9
(Saturday, 7 July 1945)
Sandy Bay 14.9 (93) v Hobart 10.11 (71) – Att: 1,010 at North Hobart Oval
New Town 16.16 (112) v Nth Hobart 6.13 (49) – Att: 1,000 at New Town Oval

Round 10
(Saturday, 21 July 1945)
Nth Hobart 14.22 (106) v Sandy Bay 14.9 (93) – Att: 1,700 at North Hobart Oval
New Town 20.20 (140) v Hobart 8.13 (61) – Att: 600 at New Town Oval

Round 11
(Saturday, 28 July 1945)
Nth Hobart 22.24 (156) v Hobart 5.8 (38) – Att: 593 at North Hobart Oval
New Town 11.12 (78) v Sandy Bay 10.9 (69) – Att: 1,800 at Queenborough Oval

Round 12
(Saturday, 4 August 1945)
Nth Hobart 16.19 (115) v New Town 12.11 (83) – Att: 2,000 at North Hobart Oval
Sandy Bay 21.16 (142) v Hobart 8.10 (58) – Att: 500 at Queenborough Oval

Round 13
(Saturday, 11 August 1945)
New Town 14.14 (98) v Hobart 13.6 (84) – Att: 600 at North Hobart Oval
Sandy Bay 10.18 (78) v Nth Hobart 10.10 (70) – Att: 1,400 at Queenborough Oval

Round 14
(Saturday, 25 August 1945)
Nth Hobart 12.9 (81) v Hobart 9.8 (62) – Att: 598 at North Hobart Oval
New Town 15.5 (95) v Sandy Bay 11.18 (84) – Att: 1,015 at New Town Oval

Round 15
(Saturday, 1 September 1945)
Sandy Bay 8.15 (63) v Hobart 3.5 (23) – Att: 620 at North Hobart Oval
Nth Hobart 11.18 (84) v New Town 11.9 (75) – Att: 1,000 at New Town Oval

Semi-final
(Saturday, 8 September 1945)
Sandy Bay: 3.3 (21) | 5.4 (34) | 8.7 (55) | 9.10 (64)
New Town: 0.2 (2) | 2.6 (18) | 4.7 (31) | 9.10 (64)
Attendance: 3,040 at North Hobart Oval

Semi-final Replay
(Saturday, 15 September 1945)
Sandy Bay: 3.4 (22) | 7.11 (53) | 10.14 (74) | 12.18 (90)
New Town: 4.2 (26) | 4.4 (28) | 5.5 (35) | 6.9 (45)
Attendance: 4,960 at North Hobart Oval

Preliminary Final
(Saturday, 22 September 1945)
Sandy Bay: 1.9 (15) | 1.11 (17) | 4.13 (37) | 7.14 (56)
Nth Hobart: 2.2 (14) | 3.4 (22) | 4.6 (30) | 5.7 (37)
Attendance: 5,011 at North Hobart Oval

Grand Final
(Saturday, 29 September 1945)
Nth Hobart: 4.1 (25) | 5.7 (37) | 6.13 (49) | 10.17 (77)
Sandy Bay: 4.1 (25) | 4.2 (26) | 7.3 (45) | 7.6 (48)
Attendance: 5,980 at North Hobart Oval

Source: All scores and statistics courtesy of the Hobart Mercury publications.

Tasmanian Football League seasons